Chrysolarentia heteroleuca is a species of moth of the  family Geometridae. It is found in Australia, including Tasmania.

Euphyia
Moths of Australia
Moths described in 1891
Taxa named by Edward Meyrick